In Ohio, State Route 23 may refer to:
U.S. Route 23 in Ohio, the only Ohio highway numbered 23 since 1927
Ohio State Route 23 (1923-1927), now SR 2 (Port Clinton to Toledo), SR 120 (Toledo to near Sylvania), and US 20 (near Sylvania to Indiana)

23